Monochamus nigrovittatus is a species of beetle in the family Cerambycidae. It was described by Stephan von Breuning in 1938. It is known from Sierra Leone and the Ivory Coast.

References

nigrovittatus
Beetles described in 1938